Podotheca is a genus of flowering plants in the tribe Gnaphalieae within the family Asteraceae. All species are endemic to Western Australia, except for Podotheca angustifolia which occurs across the south of Australia (Western Australia, South Australia, Victoria, southwestern New South Wales, †Tasmania).

Taxonomy
The genus, Podotheca, was first described by Cassini in 1822 and the type species is Podotheca angustifolia (Labill.) Less.

 Species
 Podotheca angustifolia (Labill.) Less. - sticky longheads, sticky heads     
 Podotheca chrysantha (Steetz) Benth. - yellow podotheca              
 Podotheca gnaphalioides Graham - golden long-heads     
 Podotheca pritzelii P.S.Short 
 Podotheca uniseta P.S.Short 
 Podotheca wilsonii P.S.Short

 formerly included
see Rhodanthe 
 Podotheca pollackii (F.Muell.) Diels - Rhodanthe pollackii (F.Muell.) Paul G.Wilson

References

 
Asteraceae genera
Endemic flora of Australia